István Sztáni (born 19 March 1937) is a Hungarian football manager and a former player who played as a forward.

Sztani left Hungary for Eintracht Frankfurt and faced a one-year FIFA ban. With the Main siders he won the German championship in 1959. At the end of the season he moved to Standard Liège of Belgium and stayed there until 1965 when he returned to Frankfurt. In his second stint he amounted 21 Bundesliga appearances for Eintracht.

In the 1975–76 season, Sztáni was manager at VfB Stuttgart in the 2. Bundesliga Süd, but was fired on 31 March 1976 when the planned promotion to the Bundesliga was almost out of reach.

After this tenure Sztáni managed other numerous clubs.

External links
 
 István Sztáni at eintracht-archiv.de 

1937 births
Living people
Hungarian footballers
Hungarian football managers
Association football midfielders
Standard Liège players
Eintracht Frankfurt players
K.A.A. Gent players
Bundesliga players
Belgian Pro League players
Expatriate footballers in West Germany
Expatriate footballers in Belgium
K.A.A. Gent managers
VfB Stuttgart managers
People from Ózd
Sportspeople from Borsod-Abaúj-Zemplén County
Hungarian defectors
Expatriate football managers in West Germany
Hungarian expatriate sportspeople in West Germany
Hungarian expatriate sportspeople in Belgium
Hungarian expatriate footballers
Hungarian expatriate football managers